Andrzej Opaliński (1540–1593), of Łodzia coat of arms, was a Polish–Lithuanian nobleman. Court Crown Marshal from 1572; Great Crown Marshal from 1574, starost of Greater Poland from 1598.

In 1575 supported Maximilian II, Holy Roman Emperor for the Polish crown. During next interregnum he was loyal to Sigismund III Vasa. About this time began his conflict with  Jan Zamoyski.

He was one of the members of the Polish delegation negotiating the Treaty of Bytom and Będzin in 1589.

Andrzej Opalinski (1540-1593)
Starost of Leżajsk
1540 births
1593 deaths